Benjamin Fasching (born 18 August 1988) is an Austrian darts player who plays in Professional Darts Corporation events.

In 2019, he made his PDC European Tour debut in the 2019 Austrian Darts Open, where he was defeated in the first round by Jeffrey de Zwaan.

References

External links

1988 births
Living people
Austrian darts players
Professional Darts Corporation associate players
21st-century Austrian people